Charlie Jolley (3 March 1936 – March 2014) was an English footballer, who played as a centre forward in the Football League for Tranmere Rovers and Chester.

References

External links

Tranmere Rovers F.C. players
Liverpool F.C. players
Chester City F.C. players
English Football League players
Association football forwards
Oswestry Town F.C. players
1936 births
2014 deaths
English footballers